The Latakia Tetraporticus, also sometimes referred to as the Triumphal Arch of Septimius Severus is a triumphal arch located in modern-day Latakia, Syria in the south-east region of the city, in the Port Said street. Believed to be built in honour of Roman emperor Septimius Severus, the arch dates to 183 AD and is considered a symbol of the city.

Architecture 
The arch is from 30 to 40 feet high, and has four door ways. The tetrapylon would have marked the eastern end of the Roman city, as occasional Classic Roman columns litter the surrounding streets.

Modern era 
Its sturdy and unusual cubic shape helped its survival through the earthquakes that damaged many parts of the ancient city, and it currently stands in the center of a public park.

See also 
List of Roman triumphal arches
Laodicea in Syria
National Museum of Latakia

References 

Buildings and structures in Latakia
Buildings and structures in Latakia Governorate
Ancient Roman buildings and structures in Syria
Buildings and structures completed in the 2nd century